The 160th Division()(2nd Formation) was created in March 1949 basing on the 1st Training Division of Northeastern Military Region.

The division was a part of 47th Corps.

In August 1949 the division was disbanded.

References

中国人民解放军各步兵师沿革，http://blog.sina.com.cn/s/blog_a3f74a990101cp1q.html

Infantry divisions of the People's Liberation Army
Military units and formations established in 1949
Military units and formations disestablished in 1949